Ronald A. Katz (born March 10, 1936) is an inventor and president of Ronald A. Katz Technology Licensing LP. His inventions are primarily in the field of automated call center technology. Katz has developed a portfolio of more than 50 US patents covering his innovations. His inventions are related to toll free numbers, automated attendant, automated call distribution, voice response unit, computer telephone integration and speech recognition.

As a philanthropist and Ronald Reagan UCLA Medical Center board member, Ronald Katz helped launch UCLA Operation Mend.

Katz is the son of late musician and comedian Mickey Katz, brother of Academy Award-winning actor Joel Grey, and uncle to actress and Dirty Dancing star Jennifer Grey.

Inventor and entrepreneur

In 1961, Katz co-founded Telecredit, Inc.  This was the first company to "enable merchants to verify consumer checks over the phone using an automated system without the assistance of a live operator". In 1988, Mr. Katz formed a partnership with American Express Company to provide call processing services. That partnership later became First Data Corporation.

Katz has since founded Ronald A. Katz Technology Licensing, L.P. (RAKTL). RAKTL's primary purpose is to license the Katz patent portfolio to companies using automated call centers. Over 150 companies have taken a license to the patents. RAKTL has thus earned approximately a billion dollars in license fees. such as suing accused infringers who refuse to take a license.

Katz has also founded Telebuyer, LLC, a privately held company that commercializes inventions he made relating to electronic commerce and network-based monitoring systems. In the early 1990s, Mr. Katz developed a computer-controlled video system for monitoring remote locations, and an advanced scheduling and routing system for telephone and video communications.  Mr. Katz leveraged his knowledge and work in these areas to create an electronic commerce system to help businesses reach customers in remote locations.

His patents

Characteristics 
The written description of the invention in Katz's patents usually runs 20 to 40 pages, but the claims run into hundreds of pages. "He has literally thousands of claims, and they differ only in trivial respects. Many are broad and vague, and sorting them out takes a lot of time, causing unncessary frustration. Raus." says an attorney who asked not to be named. Katz denies that his strategy is to overly amend and complicate his patents.

Reexamination 
In 2004, the Director of the United States Patent and Trademark Office ordered four of the Katz patents to be reexamined. The Director determined that a "substantial new question of patentability" had been raised. Since then, certain members of the public have also filed requests for reexamination of ten more Katz patents. These requests were based on said members of the public submitting new prior art that could raise "substantial new question of patentability" as to the validity of the patents. In three of the cases, the patent office disagreed and felt that the new prior art was not sufficiently strong to warrant a reexamination. In the other seven cases, the patent office agreed and ordered reexaminations. All reexaminations were still ongoing as of January 2007.

Partial list

List of patents undergoing reexamination

Partial list of Katz licensees

AT&T
Bank of America
Citibank
Delta Air Lines
Hewlett Packard
Home Shopping Network
IBM
Microsoft
Sears, Roebuck and Company
Wachovia
Wells Fargo
TD Ameritrade
Equifax Canada

See also
Call center
Interactive voice response
Patent troll
Reexamination

Notes
 

1936 births
American inventors
20th-century American Jews
Living people
Place of birth missing (living people)
21st-century American Jews